Hidden Gems is a compilation album by rapper O.C. from the D.I.T.C. crew, released on April 3, 2007. It's a mix of non-album songs, remixes, unreleased tracks and soundtracks and a couple of works with his group. The earliest tracks appearing here dates back to 1992 with the demo version of "O-Zone" and the previously unreleased "Snakes", and the album also includes two newly recorded songs. The tracks are placed in chronological order and works as an overseeing of O.C.'s career (excluding his own solo albums) between his start to 2007.

Track listing
 "Ozone (Original Unreleased Version)"prod. by Buckwild
 "Snakes" original demo song
 "Word...Life (Remix)"remixed by DJ Celory
 "Stronjay (Original Unreleased Version)" prod. by O.Gee
 "Crooklyn" feat. Chubb Rock and Jeru the Damaja, prod. DJ Premier
 "You Won't Go Far" feat. Organized Konfusion
 "Day One" feat. DITC, prod. by Diamond D
 "Get Yours (Remix)" feat. Big L and Diamond, prod. by Show
 "King of N.Y." prod. by J-Love
 "Bonafied" featuring Jay-Z, prod. by Buckwild
 "Wordplay" featuring Da Ranjahz, prod. by Buckwild
 "U-N-I" prod. by Buckwild
 "Half Good, Half Sinner" produced by Buckwild
 "Emotions (Remix)" featuring Ja Shawn
 "The Inventor" [New] produced by O.Gee
 "Yes Sir" featuring Sadat X" [New] produced by O.Gee

References

O.C. (rapper) albums
Hip hop compilation albums
2007 compilation albums